The Athlone Little Theatre is a theatre and performance space in Athlone, Westmeath, Ireland.

History
The Little Theatre was founded in 1936 by Capt Michael Cosgrove of the Army Signal Corps who placed an ad in the local newspaper for interested parties to meet at the Bon-Bon restaurant. At the meeting, and as the only member at the time with experience of acting and production of plays, Cosgrove was elected producer of the newly formed society.

Athlone Little Theatre is one of the oldest theatre companies in the Republic of Ireland.

References

External links
Theatre website

Buildings and structures in Athlone
County Westmeath
Theatres in the Republic of Ireland